Spruce Hill Township may refer to the following townships in the United States:

 Spruce Hill Township, Douglas County, Minnesota
 Spruce Hill Township, Juniata County, Pennsylvania